Paul Edward Willis (24 January 1970 – 9 July 2011) was an English footballer who played as a midfielder in the Football League for Halifax Town and Darlington. He also played in Darlington's 1989–90 Conference-winning team, and in the Northern Premier League for Southport.

Willis was born in Liverpool in 1970. His older brother Jimmy also became a footballer. Paul Willis and wife Dawn had two children. He died of pancreatic cancer in 2011 at the age of 41.

References

1970 births
2011 deaths
Footballers from Liverpool
English footballers
Association football midfielders
Halifax Town A.F.C. players
Darlington F.C. players
Southport F.C. players
English Football League players
National League (English football) players
Northern Premier League players
Deaths from pancreatic cancer
Deaths from cancer in England